is a station on the Tokyo Sakura Tram. This is the terminus of the line. It is separate from Waseda Station on the Tokyo Metro Tozai Line.

Lines
Waseda Station is served by Tokyo Sakura Tram.